Raúl Mata (January 26, 1947 – December 19, 2018) was a Mexican luchador, or professional wrestler, who was mostly active from the 1960s to the 1980s.

Mata was the Mexican National Light Heavyweight Champion for a record 1,164 days. He often teamed with his brother Carlos Mata and together they held the NWA Americas Tag Team Championship promoted by NWA Hollywood in the Southern California region. He also won the tag team title with Dory Dixon, Ray Mendoza, David Morgan, Victor Rivera and Chavo Guerrero (twice).

Professional wrestling career
The exact year Raul Mata began wrestling is uncertain, only that he was wrestling for Empresa Mexicana de Lucha Libre (EMLL) in the late 1960s. Mata's first major championship was the Mexican National Light Heavyweight Championship, a championship he won on April 11, 1968 when he defeated Dr. Wagner to win the vacant title. The championship reign lasted until June 18, 1972 where Mata lost the title to Enrique Vera. In the early 1970s Raul Mata had begun working for the Southern California based NWA Hollywood based in Los Angeles, CA. In NWA Hollywood he held the NWA Americas Tag Team Championship with a multitude of partners. In 1972 Mata held the title with both Dory Dixon and Ray Mendoza, both regular EMLL wrestlers as well. between December 21, 1973 and October 28, 1976 Mata held the Americas tag title a further five times, teaming with David Morgan, Victor Rivera, Chavo Guerrero twice and finally with his brother Carlos Mata. In 1977 Mata won the Mexican National Heavyweight Championship when he defeated El Halcón on December 18, 1977 to win the title.  Mata held the title until July 1, 1978 where he lost the title to El Nazi. In 1970 Mata won his NWA Americas Tag Team Championship again, this time teaming with Mando Guerrero to defeat Leroy Brown and Allen Coage for the titles, holding them for a month before losing the belts to the Twin Devils. Raul Mata also held the NWA World Light Heavyweight Championship for 11 months, winning it on January 20, 1980 from Alfonso Dantés, losing it back to Dantés on December 15, 1980.

Championships and accomplishments
Empresa Mexicana de la Lucha Libre
Mexican National Heavyweight Championship (1 time)
Mexican National Light Heavyweight Championship (1 time) 
NWA World Light Heavyweight Championship (1 time)
NWA Hollywood
NWA Americas Tag Team Championship (9 times) – with Dory Dixon (1), Ray Mendoza (1), Salavador Lothario (1), Raul Reyes (1), David Morgan (1), Victor Rivera (1), Chavo Guerrero (2), Carlos Mata (1),
NWA "Beat the Champ" Television Championship (2 times)

Luchas de Apuestas record

References

Mexican male professional wrestlers
People from Guadalajara, Jalisco
Professional wrestlers from Jalisco
1947 births
2018 deaths
20th-century professional wrestlers
NWA World Light Heavyweight Champions
NWA "Beat the Champ" Television Champions
NWA Americas Tag Team Champions